Wolfgang Heimlich (born 1 March 1917, date of death unknown) was a German swimmer who competed in the 1936 Summer Olympics. He was born in Ruszowice.

References

External links
 

1917 births
Year of death missing
People from Głogów County
Sportspeople from Lower Silesian Voivodeship
German male swimmers
German male freestyle swimmers
Olympic swimmers of Germany
Swimmers at the 1936 Summer Olympics
European Aquatics Championships medalists in swimming
20th-century German people